Keoti (Assembly constituency) is an assembly constituency in Darbhanga district in the Indian state of Bihar.

Overview
As per Delimitation of Parliamentary and Assembly constituencies Order, 2008, No. 86 Keoti Assembly constituency is composed of the following: Keoti community development block; Arai Birdipur, Banauli, Bharathi, Bharhulli, Hariharpur East, Hariharpur West, Harpur, Madhopur Basatwara, Kaligaon, Sadhwara, Dighiar, Tektar and Simri gram panchayats of Singhwara CD Block.

Keoti Assembly constituency is part of No. 6 Madhubani (Lok Sabha constituency).

Members of Legislative Assembly

Election results

2020

2015

References

External links
 

Assembly constituencies of Bihar
Politics of Darbhanga district